First Mate Karlsson's Sweethearts (Swedish: Styrman Karlssons flammor) is a 1925 Swedish silent comedy film directed by Gustaf Edgren and starring Ernst Rolf, Vera Schmiterlöw and Fridolf Rhudin. It was shot at the Råsunda Studios in Stockholm. The film's sets were designed by the art director Vilhelm Bryde.

Cast
 Ernst Rolf as 	Karl Alfred Karlsson
 Vera Schmiterlöw as 	Bessie
 Fridolf Rhudin as 	Augustsson
 Edit Ernholm as 	Blenda
 Mignon Georgian as Nanette
 Yvonne Lesti as 	Naoma
 Guye Rolf as Beatrice
 Mathias Taube as 	Sjögren
 Karin Swanström as 	Bessie Doring
 Stellan Claësson as 	Benson
 Wictor Hagman as 	John Bernertz
 Axel Hultman as Inn Keeper

References

Bibliography
 Gustafsson, Tommy. Masculinity in the Golden Age of Swedish Cinema: A Cultural Analysis of 1920s Films. McFarland, 2014.

External links

1925 films
1925 comedy films
Swedish comedy films
Swedish silent feature films
Swedish black-and-white films
Films directed by Gustaf Edgren
1920s Swedish-language films
Silent comedy films
1920s Swedish films